Moxibustion is a traditional Chinese medicine therapy which consists of burning dried mugwort (wikt:moxa) on particular points on the body. It plays an important role in the traditional medical systems of China, Japan, Korea, Vietnam, and Mongolia. Suppliers usually age the mugwort and grind it up to a fluff; practitioners burn the fluff or process it further into a cigar-shaped stick. They can use it indirectly, with acupuncture needles, or burn it on the patient's skin.

Moxibustion is promoted as a treatment for a wide variety of conditions, but its use is not backed by good evidence and it carries a risk of adverse effects.

Terminology 
The first Western remarks on moxibustion can be found in letters and reports written by Portuguese missionaries in 16th-century Japan. They called it botão de fogo, a term originally used for round-headed Western cautery irons. Hermann Buschoff, who published the first Western book on this matter in 1674 (English edition 1676), used the Japanese pronunciation mogusa. As the u is not very strongly enunciated, he spelled it "Moxa". Later authors blended "Moxa" with the Latin word combustio ("burning").

The name of the herb Artemisia (mugwort) species used to produce Moxa is called ài or àicǎo in Chinese and yomogi in Japan.
The Chinese names for moxibustion are jiǔ or jiǔshù; the Japanese use the same characters and pronounce them as kyū and kyūjutsu. In Korean the reading is tteum. Korean folklore attributes the development of moxibustion to the legendary emperor Dangun.

Theory and practice 
Practitioners use moxa to warm regions and meridian points with the intention of stimulating circulation through the points and inducing a smoother flow of blood and qi. Some believe it can treat conditions associated with the "cold" or "yang deficiencies" in Chinese Medicine. It is claimed that moxibustion mitigates against cold and dampness in the body, and can serve to turn breech babies.

Practitioners claim moxibustion to be especially effective in the treatment of chronic problems, "deficient conditions" (weakness), and gerontology. Bian Que (fl. circa 500 BCE), one of the most famous semi-legendary doctors of Chinese antiquity and the first specialist in moxibustion, discussed the benefits of moxa over acupuncture in his classic work Bian Que Neijing. He asserted that moxa could add new energy to the body and could treat both excess and deficient conditions.

Practitioners may use acupuncture needles made of various materials in combination with moxa, depending on the direction of qi flow they wish to stimulate.

There are several methods of moxibustion. Three of them are direct scarring, direct non-scarring, and indirect moxibustion. Direct scarring moxibustion places a small cone of moxa on the skin at an acupuncture point and burns it until the skin blisters, which then scars after it heals. Direct non-scarring moxibustion removes the burning moxa before the skin burns enough to scar, unless the burning moxa is left on the skin too long. Indirect moxibustion holds a cigar made of moxa near the acupuncture point to heat the skin, or holds it on an acupuncture needle inserted in the skin to heat the needle. There is also stick-on moxa.

Chuanwu lingji lu (the Record of Sovereign Teachings), by Zhang Youheng, was a treatise on acu-moxa completed in 1869 and featuring several colour illustrations of the points on the body where moxa could be applied to treat the complaint.

Effectiveness and safety 

Most research into moxibustion comes from China and is generally of low quality.  Claims are made for its effectiveness for a wide variety of conditions, with some practitioners promoting it as a panacea.

A Cochrane Review found limited evidence for the use of moxibustion in correcting breech presentation of babies and called for more experimental trials. Side effects included nausea, throat irritation, and abdominal pain from contractions. Moxibustion has also been studied for the treatment of pain, cancer, stroke, ulcerative colitis, constipation, and hypertension. Systematic reviews have found that these studies are of low quality and positive findings could be due to publication bias.

Moxibustion carries a risk of adverse effects including burns and infection.

Parallel uses of mugwort 
Mugwort amongst other herbs was often bound into smudge sticks. The Chumash people from southern California have a similar ritual. Europeans placed sprigs of mugwort under pillows to provoke dreams; and the herb had associations with the practice of magic in Anglo-Saxon times.

See also

References

External links 

 W Michel: Far Eastern Medicine in Seventeenth and Early Eighteenth Century Germany
 Hermann Buschoff, The gout, more narrowly searcht, and found out; together with the certain cure thereof. London 1676. W Michel ed. Fukuoka, March 2003. (Japanese introduction by the editor, English text)

Traditional Chinese medicine
Alternative medicine
Traditions involving fire